Rauland is a former municipality in Telemark county, Norway. The  municipality existed from 1860 until its dissolution in 1964. The area is now part of Vinje Municipality. The administrative centre was the village of Raulandsgrend (also known as Rauland) which is where Rauland Church is located.

History
In 1860, the northern part of Vinje Municipality (population: 745) was merged with the Øyfjell area in Laardal Municipality (population: 243), together they formed the new municipality of Rauland with a total population of 988. During the 1960s, there were many municipal mergers across Norway due to the work of the Schei Committee. On 1 January 1964, Rauland Municipality (population: 1,656) was merged with Vinje Municipality (population: 2,565) to form a new, larger Vinje Municipality.

Name
The municipality (originally the parish) is named after the old Rauland farm since the first Rauland Church was built there. The many marshlands in the area are filled with bog iron and for centuries its production was an important local resource.

Government
While it existed, this municipality was responsible for primary education (through 10th grade), outpatient health services, senior citizen services, unemployment and other social services, zoning, economic development, and municipal roads. During its existence, this municipality was governed by a municipal council of elected representatives, which in turn elected a mayor.

Municipal council
The municipal council  of Rauland was made up of 21 representatives that were elected to four year terms. The party breakdown of the final municipal council was as follows:

Notable people
 Sveinung Svalastoga (1772–1809), Norwegian rose painter, poet and woodcarver
 Rikard Berge (1881–1969), Norwegian folklorist, museologist, and magazine editor
 Aslaug Vaa (1889–1965), Norwegian poet and playwright
 Olav Aslakson Versto (1892–1977), Norwegian politician for the Norwegian Labour Party
 Dyre Vaa (1903–1980), Norwegian sculptor and painter

See also
List of former municipalities of Norway

References

Vinje
Former municipalities of Norway
1860 establishments in Norway
1964 disestablishments in Norway